AV8 may refer to:
Hawker Siddeley Harrier, a vertical jet fighter
McDonnell Douglas AV-8B Harrier II, a second generation vertical jet fighter
DefTech AV8, an armoured vehicle
AV8, a music label known for club mixes